Ghoradongri Assembly constituency is one of the 230 Vidhan Sabha (Legislative Assembly) constituencies of Madhya Pradesh state in central India. Ghoradingri comes under Betul (Lok Sabha constituency). It is a reserved seat for the Scheduled tribes (ST).

Members of Legislative Assembly
 1962: Jangusingh Nizam, Bharatiya Jana Sangh
 1967: Madu, Bharatiya Jana Sangh
 1972: Bishram Gurdi, Indian National Congress
 1977: Jangusingh Uike, Janata Party
 1980: Ramjilal Uike Manju, Bharatiya Janata Party
 1985: Meera, Indian National Congress
 1990: Ramjilal Uike Manju, Bharatiya Janata Party
 1993: Pratap Singh Mokham Singh, Indian National Congress
 1998: Pratap Singh Mokham Singh, Indian National Congress
 2003: Sajjan Singh Uike, Bharatiya Janata Party
 2008: Gita Ramgilal Uikey, Bharatiya Janata Party
 2013: Sajjan Singh Uike, Bharatiya Janata Party
 2016: Mangal Singh Dhurve

Election results

2016

See also
 Ghoradongri
 Betul (Lok Sabha constituency)

References

Betul district
Assembly constituencies of Madhya Pradesh